Nandiyambakkam is a suburb in northern part of Chennai, Tiruvallur district, Tamil Nadu, India. It is a northern part of Chennai city. It has a population of around 17,000 people. The neighbourhood is served by Nandiambakkam railway station of the Chennai Suburban Railway Network, MTC bus services which run from Minjur to Madras high court, Minjur to ennore, and Minjur to cmbt vice-versa 

Nandiyambakkam is one of the suburban places of Chennai which is growing in terms of Education, Industrialization, Agriculture which is expanding leaps and bounds. Minjur in its area wise twice than that of Thiruvottiyur and thrice of Ponneri which is very much near to nandiyambakkam

Minjur desalination plant which supplies 100 million litres of water per day to Chennai city was inaugurated on 31 July 2010.

Outer Ring Road (ORR) which connects the southern Chennai (Vandalur on NH 45) to Northern Chennai Minjur is a main part of the CMDA's Second Master Plan for the greater Chennai, which covers nandiambakkam region with much development in process the village and town next to it are slowly becoming residential place for people in the greater chennai.

Villages in Tiruvallur district